Malom is a Hilly Town located on the slopes of Western Ghats in Maloth village Of vellarikundu in Kasaragod district of Kerala, India.

People from Malom
 Shermi Ulahannan, Member of the Indian Kabaddi Team (Gold Medal Winners of the Asian Games 2010)
 Muralidharan A. K., Editor, Asianet News Digital (Malayalam)

Near by places

References

Nileshwaram area
Villages in Kasaragod district